William Ludwig may refer to:
 William Ludwig (screenwriter)
 William Ludwig (baritone)
 William F. Ludwig, Sr., American percussionist and founder of Ludwig Drums